Dwyane Demmin (born May 1, 1975) is a retired Trinidad and Tobago association football defender who played professionally in the USL A-League.  He also earned five caps with the Trinidad and Tobago national football team.

Youth
Demmin, the younger brother of Craig Demmin, came to the United States in 1993 to attend Belhaven University.  He spent four years on the Belhaven soccer team and was a 1994 Second Team NAIA All American.  In 1996, he was the NAIA Player of the year and was inducted into the Belhaven Hall of Fame in 2006.

Club
In 1996, Demmin played as an amateur for the Jackson Chargers in the USISL Premier League.  He was the 1996 USISL Premier League Defender of the Year.  In 1998 and 1999, he played for the Michigan Bucks in the USL Premier Development League.  In 2001, Demmin became a full professional with the Indiana Blast in the USL A-League.  In 2002, he joined the Charlotte Eagles for two seasons.  In 2007, Demmin joined the Mississippi Brilla of the USL Premier Development League.  He was All League that season.

International
Demmin earned five caps with the Trinidad and Tobago national football team.

References

Living people
1975 births
Charlotte Eagles players
Indiana Blast players
Jackson Chargers players
Flint City Bucks players
Mississippi Brilla players
Trinidad and Tobago footballers
Trinidad and Tobago expatriate footballers
Trinidad and Tobago international footballers
USL League Two players
A-League (1995–2004) players
People from Arima
Association football defenders